KMAI-LP (97.9 FM) is a low-power radio station licensed to Alturas, California, United States.  The station broadcasts highway information.

References

External links
 

MAI